Elmar Saar (19 February 1908 Tallinn – 19 December 1981 Tallinn) was an Estonian footballer, ice hockey player, coach and football referee.

1928-1936 he played 19 games for Estonia national football team.

1939 he was the manager of Estonia national football team.

References

1908 births
1981 deaths
Estonian footballers
Estonia international footballers
People from the Governorate of Estonia
Footballers from Tallinn
Association footballers not categorized by position
Estonian football managers
Estonia national football team managers
Soviet football managers
Estonian football referees
Soviet football referees